Princess Tarakanova (Italian: La principessa Tarakanova) is a 1938 French-Italian historical film directed by Fyodor Otsep and Mario Soldati and starring Annie Vernay, Pierre Richard-Willm and Roger Karl. It portrays the life of the 18th century pretender to the Russian throne Princess Tarakanova. The story has been turned into films a number of times including a 1930 film, Tarakanova.

The film's sets were designed by Andrej Andrejew, Guido Fiorini and Ettore Corsi.

The film was released in the USA under the title Betrayal.

Cast
 Annie Vernay as Élisabeth Tarakanova - la prétendante au trône de Russie 
 Pierre Richard-Willm as Il conte Alexis Orloff / Le comte Alexis Orloff - le favori de Catherine II
 Roger Karl as Il principe Radziwill / Le prince Radziwill 
 Suzy Prim as L'imperatrice Caterina II / L'impératrice Catherine II 
 Memo Benassi as L'ambasciatore russo (In the Italian version)
 Georges Paulais as L'ambassadeur russe (In the French version)
 Guglielmo Sinaz as Il grande inquisitore (In the Italian version)
 René Bergeron as Le grand inquisiteur (In the French version)
 Anna Magnani as Marietta, la cameriera (In the Italian version)
 Janine Merrey as Mariette, la camériste (In the French version)
 Antonio Centa as Il capitano Sleptozow (In the Italian version)
 Jacques Berlioz as Le capitaine Sleptozoff (In the French version)
 Abel Jacquin as Il capitano Nikolsky / Le capitaine Nikolsky. 
 Enrico Glori as Il mercante / Le marchand 
 Alberto Sordi as Ciaruskin 
 Amedeo Trilli as Ravic 
Vasco Cataldo 
Rolando Costantino
Enrico Gozzo 
Wilma Grazia 
Mario Mari 
Mauprey 
Guglielmo Morresi 
Teodoro Pescara Pateras 
Gennaro Sabatano 
Giovanni Stupin 
Germana Vivian 
Cesare Zoppetti

See also
 Princess Tarakanova (1910)
 Tarakanova (1930)
 Shadow of the Eagle (1950)
 The Rival of the Empress (1951)

References

Bibliography 
 Moliterno, Gino. The A to Z of Italian Cinema. Scarecrow Press, 2009.

External links 
 

1938 films
Italian historical drama films
French historical drama films
1930s historical drama films
1930s Italian-language films
Films directed by Fedor Ozep
Films directed by Mario Soldati
Films set in Russia
Films set in the 18th century
French multilingual films
Italian multilingual films
Italian black-and-white films
Films about Catherine the Great
Films produced by Seymour Nebenzal
1938 multilingual films
1938 drama films
Films scored by Renzo Rossellini
1930s Italian films
1930s French films